Higher Hurdsfield is a village and civil parish in the unitary authority of Cheshire East and the ceremonial county of Cheshire, England. Higher Hurdsfield Parish Council is the lowest tier of government serving the residents. It has a population of around 300, increasing at the 2011 Census to 717,
The nearest village is Rainow.

Hurdsfield Golf Club (now defunct) was founded in 1900. The club continued until the time of WW2.

See also

Listed buildings in Higher Hurdsfield

References

External links

Villages in Cheshire
Civil parishes in Cheshire